T bag may refer to:

 Tea bag
 T-Bag, a British television programme
 Tea bag (sexual act)
 T-Bag (Prison Break), a fictional character from Prison Break